Sangha Tissa I was King of Anuradhapura in the 3rd century, whose reign lasted from 248 to 252. He succeeded Vijaya Kumara as King of Anuradhapura and was succeeded by Siri Sangha Bodhi I.

See also
 List of Sri Lankan monarchs
 History of Sri Lanka

References

External links
 Kings & Rulers of Sri Lanka
 Codrington's Short History of Ceylon

S
S
S
S